The Landwasser is a river of Saxony, Germany. It is a left tributary of the Mandau, which it joins near Mittelherwigsdorf.

See also
List of rivers of Saxony

Rivers of Saxony
Upper Lusatia
Rivers of Germany